Ogilvie Aerodrome, formerly Ogilvie River Aerodrome,  is a registered aerodrome located near Ogilvie River in the Yukon, Canada and has a  wide runway that receives no maintenance.

During the late-1960s to early-1970s the Canadian Forces used this strip as a place to offload equipment and supplies in the construction of the steel bridge over the Oglive River which was carried out by 3 Field Squadron Canadian Engineers stationed at CFB Chilliwack in British Columbia.

References

Registered aerodromes in Yukon